The 2012 Karjala Tournament was played between 7–10 November 2012. The Czech Republic, Finland, Sweden and Russia played a round-robin for a total of three games per team and six games in total. Five of the matches were played in the Turkuhalli in Turku, Finland, and one match in the TipSport Arena in Prague, Czech Republic. The tournament was won by Czech Republic for the first time. The tournament was part of 2012–13 Euro Hockey Tour.

Standings

Games
All times are local.
Turku – (Eastern European Time – UTC+2) Prague – (Central European Time – UTC+1)

References

2012–13 in Swedish ice hockey
2012–13 Euro Hockey Tour
Karjala Tournament
November 2012 sports events in Europe
2010s in Prague
International sports competitions in Turku
2010s in Turku
Sports competitions in Prague